Sidoktaya, also Sitoktaya or Setoketaya is a town and seat of Sidoktaya Township in Minbu District of Magway Division,  situated in middle west region of Burma. It is bordered with Salin township to the east, with Pwintbyu township to the south-east, with Ngape township to the south, with Minbya township (Rakhine State) to the west, with Kanpelek township (Chin State) to the north-west and with Saw township to the north. It is a hilly region of Rakhine.

History
Sidoktaya is one of the oldest ancient towns in Myanmar. It is established by Prince Yazakumar (a. Min Zaya Khittaya or Min Thiri Khittaya) in Year 460 (Myanmar Era) (about 1098 A.D.). Now it is over 900 years of age. there are many archaeological places including Si-kyek-taung Pagoda, Aung-kyar Thiri Pagoda, and Sutaungpyi Pagoda. The ancient city wall had been found buried in some places.

Geography
Sidoktaya is situated at Latitude (lat): 20°25'29"N and Longitude (lon): 94°15'36"E and Elevation (approx.): 108m. Mone Creek which is the largest in the sub region flows through the Sidoktaya township. This creek is started from Mount Khaw Nu Thon which is the highest mount in the Chin Hills. The area is very mountainous and most of the mountains are above .

Demographical Condition
About 80% of the population are Chins and 20% are Bamars. Almost all are Theravada Buddhists.

Administration
Sidoktaya is a township level town and the township consists of 46 village tracts (total of 120 villages). The large villages include Pa-Aing, Kyee-Wa, Dabwin, Buywa, Ohnwah, Khwemalaung and Myaynigone.

Transportations
As it is a hilly region, there is only one main land road to Salin (37 miles). airports close to Sidoktaya, Myanmar are: the closest airport is KYP - Kyaukpyu, located 135.8 km south west of Sidoktaya. More nearby airports include AKY - Sittwe 148.1 km west, SNW - Thandwe 220.3 km south, MDL - Mandalay Intl 226.8 km north east. There are no railways and flight to Sidoktaya.

Production
The main products of Sidoktaya township are teak woods and bamboo. Annual production of bamboo is over 300,000 bamboos. Although there are agriculture, the area is only a small amount. The main crops are paddy, sesame, corn, vegetables and some kinds of beans. Industries include only rice mills and sesame mills.

Education
There is only one Basic Education High School in Sidoktaya, and five Basic Education Middle Schools, and 98 Basic Education Primary Schools.

References

External links
Geography of Sidoktaya
Map of Sidoktaya

Populated places in Magway Region
Township capitals of Myanmar